Pam Rosanio (born October 16, 1986) is an American basketball player who played internationally for Ribera Italy (2008), Eskilstuna Sweden (2008–2009) and has just finished playing this past season (2009–2010) with the Umeå Comets in Damligan, the Swedish women's basketball league.

Early life and college career
Rosanio attended Archbishop Wood High School in Warminster, Pennsylvania, where she holds the all-time school record, boys and girls, for points scored with 1,417 points.

At UMass (2004–2008), Rosanio made an immediate impact starting all but one game and finished the season earning A-10 All-Rookie honors (2005). She became UMass' all-time leader in games started with a total of 115 career starts. Over her career, she amassed 1,466 points (15.9 points per game), averaged 5 rebounds per game, and delivered a total of 306 assists. In 2006, she was named to the Preseason A-10 Second-Team All-Conference and in 2008 earned All-Atlantic 10 Honorable Mention.

Massachusetts statistics

Source

International career
After practicing for a brief period with Ribera Italy from September to November in 2008, Rosanio became a member of Eskilstuna Sweden ('08-'09). There she averaged 17 points per game and 5.3 rebounds. In 2009, Rosanio transferred to the Umeå Comets. During this past season ('09-'10), Rosanio led the Swedish league with 23.5 points per game, pulled down 6.7 rebounds, and collected 2.4 steals.

References

External links
 The Top 15 College Movies of All Time SI.com

1986 births
Living people
American expatriate basketball people in Italy
American expatriate basketball people in Sweden
Basketball players from Pennsylvania
People from Bucks County, Pennsylvania
UMass Minutewomen basketball players
Forwards (basketball)
Guards (basketball)